The Recent Pre-Islamic Period (période préislamique récente, abbreviated PIR) is an archaeological assemblage which is manifest in the few centuries around the year 0 in the lower Persian Gulf. It was discovered in the mid 1970s by Iraqi archaeologists. Some nine such sites are known at present especially ed-Dur in the Emirate Umm al-Qaiwain, and Mleiha in Sharjah in the Oman peninsula. Since the mid 1980s different teams studied especially these two sites, which are the largest in terms of surface area. They contain settlements, religious and industrial areas as well as cemeteries loosely scattered over a wide area. Mlayḥa forms an irregularly shaped surface of c. 4 km2. Two PIR sites have been identified in Central Oman, at Samāʾil/al-Bārūnī and at ʿAmlāʾ/al-Fuwaydah.

Striking are forts some 50m in width with corner bastions and casemate walls. Some of the graves are large, rectangularly well-formed, of cut stones. There is great variety in the pottery. Different wares contain a variety of tempering materials, are wheel-turned and shows numerous shapes. The PIR has characteristic stone fashioned of soft stone such as serpentinite, steatite or chlorite. Numerous iron arrow-heads and daggers came to light in the graves. Glass finds are numerous. Imports are numerous from the upper Gulf, but also from South Asia. Several Greco-Roman finds came to light.

Aside from so-called balsamaria few pottery finds are held in common with the Late Iron Age known at Samad al-Shan in central Oman. While the two assemblages are contemporary, their connections are still little researched. The central Oman site al-Fuwayda, 1 km east of ʿAmlāʾ town, resembles in its find spectrum more those of the PIR than the Samad assemblage of central Oman. 

Finds from these assemblages challenge the view around the year 0 of south-eastern Arabia during the centuries, in which the Persian Parthians rule replaced later by the Sasanians, an interpretation which dominates the secondary literature for the past 50 years. Although Persian invaders colonised over the centuries, it was difficult for them logistically to hold more than a few towns and roads. Since antique Persian finds are unimportant here more sophisticated interpretative models must be sought. At the end of 2015 a monumental tomb in Area F at Mlayha yielded a lime-plaster funerary stele with an Aramaic and Hasaitic bilingual inscription. It states that the tomb was built by the deceased’s son, mentioning a date and his name, family lineage and function in the service of the "king of ʿmn", Oman. Not only does this 87 x 52 x 16 cm inscribed stone refer to the king, but it is also dated to 215/214 BCE by means of stratified stamped transport vessels. The rulers also minted coins in billon and silver with legends such as Abiʾl son of Bgln which boldly proclaim their political independence in Aramaic, the lingua franca of the age. This amounts to a declaration of sovereignty or a warning.

Sources
 Michel Mouton, La péninsule d’Oman de la fin de l’âge du fer au début de la période sasanide (250 av. – 350 ap. JC), BAR International Series 1776, 1992 (printed 2008) .
 Ernie Haerinck, Excavations at ed-Dur (Umm al-Qaiwain, United Arab Emirates, vol. 2: the Tombs, Leuven, 2001, .
 Paul Yule, Cross-roads – Early and Late Iron Age South-eastern Arabia, Abhandlungen Deutsche Orient-Gesellschaft, vol. 30, Wiesbaden 2014, .

References

External links
 Amlah
 Archaeology of Oman
 Samad al-Shan
 Oman

History of Oman
Archaeological sites in Oman